Compound S may refer to:

 Cortodoxone
 Zidovudine, by trade name